In continuum mechanics, the most commonly used measure of stress is the Cauchy stress tensor, often called simply the stress tensor or "true stress".  However, several alternative measures of stress can be defined:
The Kirchhoff stress.
The Nominal stress.
The first Piola–Kirchhoff stress.  This stress tensor is the transpose of the nominal stress.
The second Piola–Kirchhoff stress or PK2 stress.
The Biot stress

Definitions 
Consider the situation shown in the following figure. The following definitions use the notations shown in the figure.  

Note that this surface can either be a hypothetical cut inside the body or an actual surface. The quantity  is the deformation gradient tensor,  is its determinant.

Cauchy stress 
The Cauchy stress (or true stress) is a measure of the force acting on an element of area in the deformed configuration.  This tensor is symmetric and is defined via

or

Kirchhoff stress 
The quantity, 
 

It is used widely in numerical algorithms in metal plasticity (where there
is no change in volume during plastic deformation). It can be called weighted Cauchy stress tensor as well.

Piola–Kirchhoff stress

Nominal stress/First Piola–Kirchhoff stress 
The nominal stress  is the transpose of the first Piola–Kirchhoff stress (PK1 stress, also called engineering stress)  and is defined via

or

This stress is unsymmetric and is a two-point tensor like the deformation gradient.
The asymmetry derives from the fact that, as a tensor, it has one index attached to the reference configuration and one to the deformed configuration.

Second Piola–Kirchhoff stress 
If we pull back  to the reference configuration we obtain the traction acting on that surface before the deformation  assuming it behaves like a generic vector belonging to the deformation. In particular we have

or, 

The PK2 stress is symmetric and is defined via the relation

Therefore,

Biot stress 
The Biot stress is useful because it is energy conjugate to the right stretch tensor .  The Biot stress is defined as the symmetric part of the tensor  where  is the rotation tensor obtained from a polar decomposition of the deformation gradient.  Therefore, the Biot stress tensor is defined as

The Biot stress is also called the Jaumann stress.

The quantity  does not have any physical interpretation.  However, the unsymmetrized Biot stress has the interpretation

Relations

Relations between Cauchy stress and nominal stress
From Nanson's formula relating areas in the reference and deformed configurations:

Now, 

Hence,

or,

or,

In index notation,

Therefore,

Relations between nominal stress and second P–K stress
Recall that

and

Therefore,

or (using the symmetry of ),

In index notation,

Alternatively, we can write

Relations between Cauchy stress and second P–K stress
Recall that

In terms of the 2nd PK stress, we have

Therefore,

In index notation,

Since the Cauchy stress (and hence the Kirchhoff stress) is symmetric, the 2nd PK stress is also symmetric.

Alternatively, we can write

or, 

Clearly, from definition of the push-forward and pull-back operations, we have

and 

Summary of conversion formula 
Key:

See also 
 Stress (physics)
 Finite strain theory
 Continuum mechanics
 Hyperelastic material
 Cauchy elastic material
 Critical plane analysis

References 

Solid mechanics
Continuum mechanics
Gustav Kirchhoff
Tensor physical quantities